Zhytlobud-1 Kharkiv (1" Харків) is a Ukrainian professional women's football club from Kharkiv, Ukraine.

History
In 2006 the female team received financial support from the Kharkiv construction company "Zhytlobud-1" and was renamed after it as Zhytlobud-1 Kharkiv.

Honours
Top Division champion (9): 2006, 2008, 2011, 2012, 2013, 2014, 2015, 2017–18, 2018–19
Women's Cup winners (12): 2003, 2004, 2006, 2007, 2008, 2010, 2011, 2013, 2014, 2015, 2016, 2018

Current squad

Former internationals
  Ukraine: Iya Andrushchak, Olha Basanska, Svitlana Frishko, Valentyna Kotyk, Maryna Masalska, Olha Ovdiychuk, Nataliya Sukhorukova, Inessa Tytova
  Belarus: Hanna Tatarynova
  Lithuania: Raimonda Kudytė

Managers
 2006 – 2009 Oleh Ruban
 2009 – 2016 Yaroslav Lantsfer
 2016 – 2017 Valentyn Kryachko
 2017 – Valentyna Kotyk
 2019 – Maksym Rakhayev (interim)
 2019 – Serhiy Sapronov

European record
''For previous record, see WFC Arsenal Kharkiv

References

External links
  Official Website

 
Women's football clubs in Ukraine
2006 establishments in Ukraine
Football clubs in Kharkiv
Association football clubs established in 2006
Ukrainian Women's League clubs